Carlos García Badías (born 29 April 1984) is a Spanish former footballer who played as a central defender, currently a manager.

He spent most of his professional career with Almería, playing 208 competitive matches for the club and appearing in three La Liga seasons. Additionally, he had a four-year spell with Maccabi Tel Aviv in the Israeli Premier League.

Club career

Espanyol and Almería
Born in Barcelona, Catalonia, García was a product of local RCD Espanyol's youth ranks. He would only appear for the first team on three occasions, during the 2003–04 season (three defeats), also serving a loan stint with Polideportivo Ejido in the Segunda División the following campaign.

García stayed in Andalusia in 2005, being sold by Espanyol to second-division UD Almería. He was a starter from the beginning, being instrumental in their first-ever La Liga promotion in the 2006–07 campaign.

Deemed surplus to requirements by manager Hugo Sánchez, García was loaned to neighbours Real Betis for 2009–10's second-tier season. After not being able to help the Verdiblancos return to the top flight he rejoined Almería, being first-choice under new manager Juan Manuel Lillo and both his successors José Luis Oltra and Roberto Olabe, scoring once in 33 games as they were eventually relegated after a four-year stay.

Maccabi Tel Aviv and coaching
García moved abroad for the first time in his career in June 2012, signing a three-year contract with Maccabi Tel Aviv F.C. in the Israeli Premier League. In his first season he was teamed up in the centre of defence with Eitan Tibi, with the pair performing solidly as the club won the national championship after a ten-year drought.

Aged 29, García made his debut in European competition in the 2013–14 campaign, featuring in both the UEFA Champions League qualification matches and the UEFA Europa League group stage. In the domestic front he was part of the squad that set a new league record for minutes without conceding a goal, surpassing Hapoel Haifa FC's 585 from 1999.

García retired in 2017 at the age of 33, after one season in the Turkish Süper Lig with Alanyaspor. Immediately after, he returned to Maccabi as assistant to his compatriot Jordi Cruyff; the pair worked together again in the Chinese Super League, at Chongqing Dangdai Lifan F.C. and Shenzhen FC.

In January 2022, García became manager of Liga Leumit side Beitar Tel Aviv Bat Yam FC.

International career
García was part of the Spain under-16 squad at the 2001 UEFA European Under-16 Championship in England, winning the tournament alongside top scorer Fernando Torres. Two years later, he contributed seven starts for the under-20s as they finished runners-up to Brazil in the FIFA World Cup.

García reunited again with Cruyff for a brief period in 2020, when the latter was appointed at the Ecuador national team.

Honours
Maccabi Tel Aviv
Israeli Premier League: 2012–13, 2013–14, 2014–15
Israel State Cup: 2014–15 
Toto Cup: 2014–15

Spain U16
UEFA European Under-16 Championship: 2001

Spain U23
Mediterranean Games: 2005

Spain U20
FIFA U-20 World Cup runner-up: 2003

References

External links

1984 births
Living people
Spanish footballers
Footballers from Barcelona
Association football defenders
La Liga players
Segunda División players
Segunda División B players
RCD Espanyol B footballers
RCD Espanyol footballers
Polideportivo Ejido footballers
UD Almería players
Real Betis players
Israeli Premier League players
Maccabi Tel Aviv F.C. players
Süper Lig players
Alanyaspor footballers
Spain youth international footballers
Spain under-21 international footballers
Spain under-23 international footballers
Competitors at the 2005 Mediterranean Games
Mediterranean Games medalists in football
Mediterranean Games gold medalists for Spain
Catalonia international footballers
Spanish expatriate footballers
Expatriate footballers in Israel
Expatriate footballers in Turkey
Spanish expatriate sportspeople in Israel
Spanish expatriate sportspeople in Turkey
Spanish football managers
Spanish expatriate football managers
Expatriate football managers in Israel
Spanish expatriate sportspeople in China
Spanish expatriate sportspeople in Ecuador